Ivo Orlandi (30 June 1923 – 24 August 2000) was a Venezuelan sports shooter. He competed in the trap event at the 1968 Summer Olympics.

Orlandi died in Modena on 24 August 2000, at the age of 77.

References

External links

1923 births
2000 deaths
Venezuelan male sport shooters
Olympic shooters of Venezuela
Shooters at the 1968 Summer Olympics
Sportspeople from Modena
Italian emigrants to Venezuela
20th-century Venezuelan people